

Sovereign states

A
 Afghanistan – Emirate of Afghanistan  
 – Principality of Andorra 
 Anhalt-Bernburg – Duchy of Anhalt-Bernburg 
 Anhalt-Dessau – Duchy of Anhalt-Dessau 
 Anhalt-Köthen – Duchy of Anhalt-Köthen 
 Ankole – Kingdom of Ankole 
Annam – Empire of Annam 
Anziku – Anziku Kingdom 
 Argentina - United Provinces of the River Plate 
 Aro – Aro Confederacy 
 – Asante Union 
 – Austrian Empire

B
 Baden – Grand Duchy of Baden
Baguirmi – Kingdom of Baguirmi
Bambara – Bambara Empire
Baol – Kingdom of Baol
Basutoland – Kingdom of Basutoland
 – Kingdom of Bavaria
 – Benin Empire
 – Kingdom of Bhutan
 →  Bolivia – Bolivian Republic
Bornu – Bornu Empire
 – Empire of Brazil 
 – Free City of Bremen
 – Sultanate of Brunei
 – Duchy of Brunswick
 Buganda – Kingdom of Buganda
 Bukhara – Emirate of Bukhara
 Bunyoro – Kingdom of Bunyoro-Kitara
 Burma – Kingdom of Burma
Burundi – Kingdom of Burundi

C
 Cambodia – Kingdom of Cambodia
Cayor – Kingdom of Cayor
 →  Central America
United Provinces of Central America 
Federal Republic of Central America 

State of Chile 
Republic of Chile 
 China – Great Qing Empire
 →  →  Colombia – Republic of Colombia
 Cospaia – Republic of Cospaia

D
 Dahomey – Kingdom of Dahomey
 – Kingdom of Denmark
 Durrani – Durrani Empire

E
 – Ethiopian Empire

F
 Fiji – Tui Viti
 →  France – Kingdom of France
 Frankfurt – Free City of Frankfurt
Futa Jallon – Imamate of Futa Jallon
Futa Toro – Imamate of Futa Toro

G
Garo – Kingdom of Garo
Gomma – Kingdom of Gomma
Gumma – Kingdom of Gumma

H
 → 
Kingdom of Haiti 
 Republic of Haiti (from October 8, 1820)
 – Free City of Hamburg
  – Kingdom of Hanover
 Hawaii – Kingdom of Hawaii
 Hesse-Darmstadt – Grand Duchy of Hesse and by Rhine
 Hesse-Homburg – Landgraviate of Hesse-Homburg
 Hesse-Kassel (or Hesse-Cassel) – Electorate of Hesse
 Hohenzollern-Hechingen – Principality of Hohenzollern-Hechingen
 Hohenzollern-Sigmaringen – Principality of Hohenzollern-Sigmaringen
 Holstein – Duchy of Holstein

I
 Ionian Islands – United States of the Ionian Islands

J
Janjero – Kingdom of Janjero
 Japan – Tokugawa shogunate
Jimma – Kingdom of Jimma
 Johor – Johor Sultanate
 – Jolof Kingdom

K
Kaabu – Kingdom of Kaabu
Kaffa – Kingdom of Kaffa
Kénédougou – Kénédougou Kingdom
Khasso – Kingdom of Khasso
 Khiva – Khanate of Khiva
 Kokand – Khanate of Kokand
Kong – Kong Empire
 Kongo – Kingdom of Kongo
 Korea – Kingdom of Great Joseon
Koya Temne – Kingdom of Koya

L
 – Principality of Liechtenstein
Limmu-Ennarea – Kingdom of Limmu-Ennarea
 Lippe – Principality of Lippe-Detmoldt
 Loango – Kingdom of Loango
Luba – Luba Empire
 Lubeck – Free City of Lubeck
Lunda – Lunda Empire
 – Grand Duchy of Luxembourg

M
 Madawaska – Republic of Madawaska 
 Maldives – Sultanate of Maldives
 Manipur – Kingdom of Manipur
 Massina – Massina Empire
 Mecklenburg-Schwerin – Grand Duchy of Mecklenburg-Schwerin
 Mecklenburg-Strelitz – Grand Duchy of Mecklenburg-Strelitz
 Mexico – Mexican Empire 
 Mindanao – Sultanate of Maguindanao
 Modena – Duchies of Modena and Reggio
 Moldavia – Principality of Moldavia
 – Principality of Monaco
 Montenegro – Prince-Bishopric of Montenegro
 – Sultanate of Morocco

N
 Nassau – Duchy of Nassau
 Nepal – Kingdom of Nepal
 – United Kingdom of the Netherlands
 Norway – Kingdom of Norway (in a personal union with Sweden)

O
 Oldenburg – Grand Duchy of Oldenburg
 – Sublime Ottoman State
Ouaddai – Ouaddai Empire
Oyo – Oyo Empire

P
 Pahang – Sultanate of Pahang
 – States of the Church
 →  – Republic of Paraguay
 – Duchy of Parma, Piacenza and Guastalla
 Perak – Sultanate of Perak
 Persia – Persian Empire
 →  →  Peru – Peruvian Republic 
 Portugal – Kingdom of Portugal 
 Portugal, Brazil and the Algarves – United Kingdom of Portugal, Brazil and the Algarves 
 – Kingdom of Prussia
 Punjab – Sikh Empire

R
Rapa Nui – Kingdom of Rapa Nui
 Reuss-Ebersdorf – Principality of Reuss-Ebersdorf 
 Reuss Elder Line – Principality of Reuss Elder Line
 Reuss-Lobenstein – Principality of Reuss-Lobenstein 
 Reuss-Lobenstein-Ebersdorf – Principality of Reuss-Lobenstein-Ebersdorf 
 Reuss Junior Line – Principality of Reuss Junior Line
 Russia – Russian Empire
Rwanda – Kingdom of Rwanda
 – Kingdom of Ryūkyū

S
Samoa – Kingdom of Samoa
 – Most Serene Republic of San Marino
 – Kingdom of Sardinia
 Saxe-Altenburg – Duchy of Saxe-Altenburg 
Saxe-Coburg-Saalfeld – Duchy of Saxe-Coburg-Saalfeld 
 Saxe-Coburg-Gotha – Duchy of Saxe-Coburg and Gotha 
 Saxe-Gotha-Altenburg – Duchy of Saxe-Gotha-Altenburg 
Saxe-Hildburghausen – Duchy of Saxe-Hildburghausen 
 Saxe-Meiningen – Duchy of Saxe-Meiningen
 Saxe-Weimar-Eisenach – Grand Duchy of Saxe-Weimar-Eisenach
 – Kingdom of Saxony
 Schaumburg-Lippe – Principality of Schaumburg-Lippe
 Schleswig – Duchy of Schleswig
 Schwarzburg-Rudolstadt – Principality of Schwarzburg-Rudolstadt
 Schwarzburg-Sondershausen – Principality of Schwarzburg-Sondershausen
 Selangor – Sultanate of Selangor
 – Kingdom of Siam
Sikkim – Chogyalate of Sikkim
 Sokoto – Sokoto Caliphate
 – Kingdom of Spain
 Sulu – Sultanate of Sulu
 – Kingdom of Sweden (in personal union with Norway)
 – Swiss Confederation

T
 Tahiti – Kingdom of Tahiti
 Tonga – Tu'i Tonga
 Toro – Toro Kingdom 
 Tuscany – Grand Duchy of Tuscany
 – Kingdom of the Two Sicilies

U
 – United Kingdom of Great Britain and Ireland
 →  – United States of America

W
 Waldeck-Pyrmont – Principality of Waldeck and Pyrmont
Welayta – Kingdom of Welayta
 – Kingdom of Württemberg

Z
 Zululand – Kingdom of the Zulus

States claiming sovereignty
Equator – Confederation of the Equator 
Goust – Republic of Goust
 Greece – Hellenic Republic 
 Muskogee – State of Muskogee
 Soran – Soran Emirate

See also
List of Bronze Age states
List of Iron Age states
List of Classical Age states
List of states during Late Antiquity
List of states during the Middle Ages

1820s
1820s